Adieu Gary (also known as Goodbye Gary Cooper) is a 2009 French film directed by Nassim Amaouche. This is the first feature-film director who was brought over to the International Week of criticism at the 2009 Cannes Film Festival and was awarded the Grand Prix.

Plot 
In the middle of a neglected French suburb, a family and close friends day-dream of life and love. In his debut feature writer/director Nassim Amaouche introduces the audience to their world, revealing the ties between the various characters, crafted by a brilliant French-Moroccan ensemble cast that includes Jean-Pierre Bacri, Dominique Reymond, Yasmine Belmadi and Alexandre Bonnin. The film evolves around conscientious Francis, his recently liberated ex-con son Samir, neighbour (and Francis' illicit lover) Maria and her imaginative son José - who deals with all this by escaping into a Wild West fantasy world where his father is a heroic cowboy played by Gary Cooper.

Cast
 Jean-Pierre Bacri as Francis
 Dominique Reymond as Maria
 Yasmine Belmadi as Samir
 Mhamed Arezki as Icham
 Sabrina Ouazani as Nejma
 Hab-Eddine Sebiane as Abdel
 Alexandre Bonnin as José
 Bernard Blancan as Michel
 Frédéric Hulne as The doctor
 Mohamed Mahmoud Ould Mohamed as Abdel's and Nejma's father
 Abdelhafid Metalsi as The new neighbour
 Mariam Koné as The saleswoman

References

External links

2009 films
French drama films
2000s French films